Dovlatov is a 2018 Russian biographical film about writer Sergei Dovlatov, directed by Aleksei German and starring Milan Marić and Danila Kozlovsky. It premiered at the 2018 Berlin International Film Festival in competition on the 17th of February, where it was awarded a Silver Bear for Outstanding Artistic Contribution for costume and production design. It received generally positive reviews from critics.

Plot
The film tells about a few days in the life of writer Sergei Dovlatov (Milan Marić) in 1971 Leningrad, on the eve of the emigration of his friend, the future Nobel laureate Joseph Brodsky (Artur Beschastny). Sergei is determined to stay and lead a normal life with his wife Elena (Helena Sujecka) and daughter Katya (Eva Herr). Dovlatov's manuscripts are regularly rejected by the official media as his point of view is deemed undesirable. His friend is artist David (Danila Kozlovsky), a fartsovshchik who sells foreign goods on the black market. During this time Sergei tries to buy his daughter a German doll but is not able to find one anywhere.

Cast

Reception
Metacritic gives the film a weighted average score of 68 out of 100, based on 8 critics, indicating "generally favorable reviews".

References

External links
 
 

2018 films
Films directed by Aleksei Alekseivich German
Russian biographical drama films
2018 biographical drama films
Biographical films about writers
Silver Bear for outstanding artistic contribution
Russian-language Netflix original films
2018 drama films